Haji Abdul Haq Khan (borne 25 June 1967) is a Pakistani politician hailing from Pattan, Kohistan District belonging to Pakistan Tehreek-e-Insaf. He served as Adviser to the chief minister on Inter Provincial Coordination  and member of the assembly in the 10th Khyber Pakhtunkhwa Assembly. In general election 2013 Abdul Haq Khan elected as independent from PK-61 Kohistan-I and later join Pakistan Tehreek-e-Insaf (PTI).

Haji Abdul Haq Khan got his degree in Bachelor of Arts.

External links

References

1967 births
Living people
Pashtun people
Khyber Pakhtunkhwa MPAs 2013–2018
People from Kohistan District
Pakistan Tehreek-e-Insaf politicians